is a Japanese voice actress affiliated with Mausu Promotion.

Filmography

Anime television series
Tales of Agriculture - Mother
 Stitch! - Taka, Boogoo

Games
Metal Gear Solid 4: Guns of the Patriots - MGO Soldiers

Dubbing Roles

Live Action Films
The Suite Life Movie - Cody Martin (Cole Sprouse)

Live Action Television
Cold Case - Young Ariel Shuman (Daveigh Chase)
The Suite Life of Zack & Cody - Cody Martin (Cole Sprouse)
The Suite Life on Deck - Cody Martin (Cole Sprouse)

Theatrical Animation
 Arthur and the Invisibles - Additional Voice
 Kung Fu Panda - Mother of Rabbits

References

External links
Hitomi Hase at Ameba 

1979 births
Living people
Voice actresses from Hokkaido
Japanese voice actresses
Mausu Promotion voice actors